The Quaid-e-Millath Government College for Women is an educational institution in Chennai (Madras), Tamil Nadu. In 1974-75 it replaced the Government Arts College for Men, which was shifted to Nandanam. The Mount Road Arts College was the legacy of the Muslim Rulers of Wallajah. The Madras Mohammedan College and the Madrasa-e-Azam school for boys functioned from this location. After Independence, Mohamedan College was renamed as Government Arts College for Men (1948). The premises are now divided between the Madrasa-e-Azam school and the Quaid-e-Millath Government College for Women.

External links

Official website

Women's universities and colleges in Chennai
Colleges affiliated to University of Madras
Educational institutions established in 1974
1974 establishments in Tamil Nadu